Olive Gloria Shea (May 30, 1910 – February 8, 1995) was an American film actress. She was sometimes billed as Olive Shea.

Biography 
Born in New York City, Shea received her schooling at the Convent of Notre Dame de Sande and was trained for the stage by Florenz Ziegfeld Jr.

Shea had the female lead role in the Universal serial, The Phantom of the Air (1933). On stage (billed as Olive Shea), she had the role of Baby in the Broadway production of Blind Mice (1930)

She married Robert J. Stroh in 1938.

On February 8, 1995, Shea died in Jacksonville, Florida.

Selected filmography
 Glorifying the American Girl (1929)
 Women Won't Tell (1932)
 The Night Mayor (1932)
 Big City Blues (1932) as Agnes (uncredited)
 Big Time or Bust (1933)
 The Dude Bandit (1933)
 Strange People (1933)
 Dance Girl Dance  (1933)
 A Successful Failure (1934)
 Demon for Trouble (1934)
 Tomorrow's Youth (1934)
 The Oil Raider (1934)
 I Like It That Way (1934)
 Money Means Nothing (1934)
 Laddie (1935)
 Dangerous Intrigue (1936)
 Black Gold (1936)

References

Bibliography
 Michael R. Pitts. Poverty Row Studios, 1929-1940: An Illustrated History of 55 Independent Film Companies, with a Filmography for Each. McFarland & Company, 2005.

External links

1910 births
1995 deaths
American film actresses
Actresses from New York City
20th-century American actresses